Luciano Leonel Recalde (born 12 August 1995) is an Argentine professional footballer who plays as a centre-back for Primera División Ecuatoriana side Deportivo Cuenca.

Career
Recalde's career got underway with Rosario Central of the Argentine Primera División. In January 2016, Recalde completed a loan move to Primera B Nacional team Villa Dálmine. A victory over Juventud Unida on 19 March marked his professional career debut, which was the first of five appearances during 2016. He remained with Villa Dálmine for the following campaign, 2016–17, and participated in fourteen further matches. January 2018 saw Recalde make his debut for Rosario Central, playing the full ninety minutes of a match with Gimnasia y Esgrima on 29 January.

Career statistics
.

References

External links

1995 births
Living people
Argentine footballers
Argentine expatriate footballers
People from Rosario Department
Argentine people of Basque descent
Association football defenders
Argentine Primera División players
Primera Nacional players
Peruvian Primera División players
Rosario Central footballers
Villa Dálmine footballers
Club Atlético Platense footballers
Cienciano footballers
Argentine expatriate sportspeople in Peru
Expatriate footballers in Peru
Sportspeople from Santa Fe Province